Laurent Vacouabé (born Laureano Tacuavé Martínez, on July 14, 1809 in Paysandú, Uruguay, died in Paris, France) was a young Native American from present day Uruguay. Son of Eustaquio Tacuavé and Francisca Martínez, younger brother of María Manuel Tacuavé (12 February 1805) and Apolinaria Tacuavé (23 July 1807). It is uncertain if he was Charrúa of Guaraní and Spaniard descent or if he was Guaraní of Spanish-Charrúan descent.

After the European conquest and colonization, the Charrúa population declined at the hands of local authorities, being practically exterminated in a massacre led by Bernabé Rivera on 11 April 1831.

Four surviving Charrúa were captured at Salsipuedes. These were Tacuabé; his partner María Micaela Guyunusa, daughter of María Rosa, born on 1806; Senaca o Senaqué, a 52- to 57-year-old medicine man and warrior; and Vaimaca-Piru (Perú), a 54-year-old warrior (cacique in charruan) and a general of Artigas. All four were taken to Paris, France by François Curel on November 11, 1833, where they were exhibited to the public as a circus attraction. Tacuabé had also a musical instrument.

Guyunusa and Vaimaca gave birth to a daughter few months after they were taken. Vaimaca, Senaque and Guyunusa died during the first year in France. Eventually they all died in France, including the baby. Tacuabe was baptised by the French as Jean Soulassol. It is also said that he and the child of her late wife, Micaela, escaped. In 2012 documents were found indicating that the child (Caroline Tacouabé) died of tuberculosis just like her mother, and that Laureano adopted the life of a Frenchman and probably died of sickness or old age.

In Montevideo, Uruguay there is a monument called The Last Charrúas, (Los Ultimos Charrúas in Spanish), depicting Tacuabé.

They were not the first to set sail to France: a young (said to be about 18 to 20 years old) "cacique" named by a traveling Spanish ship Lieutenant, Navio Louis Marius Barra as Ramón Mataojo, (being that the native was found in "el río Mataojo grande") had traveled to France in January 1832.

Notes

References
Burford, Tim. Uruguay. Bucks, UK: Bradt Travel Guides, 2011. .

1809 births
Year of death missing
Uruguayan people of Charrúa descent
Uruguayan people of Guaraní descent
Uruguayan people of Spanish descent